William Jameson Thompson, CBE (27 October 1885 – 17 November 1975) was a long-serving Anglican bishop who spent much of his career in Iran (then Persia).

Educated at Monkton Combe School and Trinity College, Cambridge, he served in the Great War as an officer in the Royal Engineers. Ordained in 1921, he was initially principal of the Stuart Memorial College, Isfahan then archdeacon of the area until his elevation to the episcopate as the third Anglican bishop of Iran in 1935. He retired in 1960 and died 15 years later.

References

1885 births
1975 deaths
People educated at Monkton Combe School
Alumni of Trinity College, Cambridge
Royal Engineers officers
Anglican archdeacons in Iran
Anglican bishops of the Diocese of Iran
20th-century Anglican bishops in the Middle East
Commanders of the Order of the British Empire